Bela biscuit is a popular traditional biscuit baked in Chittagong, Bangladesh. It is a commonly eaten at afternoon tea by people in Chittagong. For 150 years it has been popular with Chittagonian people.

Ingredients
Bela biscuits are made from flour, sugar, baking soda and other, secret ingredients. Other ingredients that can be added are milk, salt, egg, yeast, cinnamon powder and fennel powder.

Gani Bakery 
Gani Bakery is a bakery at Chandanpura in Chittagong founded in 1880s by Abdul Gani Showdagar which is still notable for it Bela biscuits. According to many, Gani was the first to introduce Bela biscuit in Chattogram inspired by the Portuguese. In 1945, Gani declared the bakery a Waqf property.

References

Biscuits
Chittagonian cuisine